Mohua may refer to:

Golden Bay / Mohua, a bay at the northwest end of New Zealand's South Island
Yellowhead (bird) or mōhua, a small bird endemic to the South Island of New Zealand
The Ministry of Housing and Urban Affairs of India, abbreviated MoHua